WKCI-FM (101.3 MHz) is a commercial radio station broadcasting a Top 40 (CHR) format. Licensed to the suburb of Hamden, Connecticut, it serves New Haven and Hartford. The station is owned by iHeartMedia.

The studios are in Radio Towers Park on Benham Street in Hamden, where it shares facilities with sister stations WELI and WAVZ. The station's transmitter is on Madmare Mountain in Hamden near the WTNH transmitter site (where WKCI-FM formerly transmitted from until moving to its current tower in 2003).

Throughout the 1980s, WKCI was an affiliate of Rick Dees Weekly Top 40. WKCI-FM began broadcasts in HD Radio in December 2004. Its HD2 signal airs a mainstream urban format, providing a second option to WZMX, and is simulcast on FM translator W265DB at 100.9 MHz, known as "100.9 The Beat."  100.9 The Beat signed on the air at 12:00 a.m. on June 23, 2015. The HD3 signal simulcasts sister station 960 AM WELI, which airs a talk radio format.  iHeartMedia, Inc. also owns a talk station in Waynesboro, Virginia which shares the call sign WKCI on AM 970.

References

External links
 

 
 
 

Mass media in New Haven, Connecticut
Mass media in New Haven County, Connecticut
KCI-FM
Contemporary hit radio stations in the United States
1969 establishments in Connecticut
Radio stations established in 1969
IHeartMedia radio stations